Botany was an electoral district of the Legislative Assembly in the Australian state of New South Wales, originally created in 1894, partly replacing Redfern, and named after and including the Sydney suburb of Botany. In 1920, parts of the electoral districts of Botany, Alexandria, Enmore, Newtown and Redfern were combined to create a new incarnation of Botany, which elected five members by proportional representation. This was replaced by single member electorates, including parts of Botany, Alexandria, Enmore, Newtown and Redfern for the 1927 election. Botany was abolished in 1950, being partly replaced by Maroubra.

Members for Botany

Election results

References

Botany
Botany
Botany
1894 establishments in Australia
1950 disestablishments in Australia